H4Z4RD is a 2022 Dutch-language action comedy film, written by Trent Haaga and directed by Jonas Govaerts. It stars Dimitri Vegas, Jennifer Heylen, and Jeroen Perceval, with guest star Frank Lammers.

The film follows Noah Hazard and his brother Carlos, who take a job for money, only to find themselves in deeper trouble than they were expecting.

H4Z4RD was released on July 20 in Belgium and received limited screenings in the United States throughout the year. It received mostly positive reviews from critics.

Plot
The film follows Noah Hazard, who takes a job with his brother that leads to an adventure that endangers his family and his prized car.

Release
The film was released on July 20 in Belgium. In the United States, the film premiered at the Fantastic Fest film festival. In Canada, the film was shown on October 19 at Toronto After Dark.

Reception
The film received overall positive reviews from critics.

Bloody Disgusting praised the film, calling it, "darkly funny, violent, and full of unexpected detours".
/Film also praised the film, giving it 7.5/10 stars and calling it, "a full-throttle midnighter that barely runs out of gas".

References

2020s Dutch-language films
Dutch-language Belgian films
2022 action comedy films
Belgian action films